Kaattu Rani is a 1985 Indian Malayalam-language film,  directed by A. T. Raghu and produced by Unnimary. The film stars Shankar, Unnimary, Anuradha and Sudheer in the lead roles. The film has musical score by Rajan–Nagendra.

Cast 
Shankar
Unnimary
Anuradha
Sudheer

Soundtrack 
The music was composed by Rajan–Nagendra and the lyrics were written by Anthikkad Mani.

References

External links 
 

1985 films
1980s Malayalam-language films